Yu Luojin (born 1946 in Beijing) is a Chinese novelist.

Life
She graduated from Beijing Arts and Crafts School in 1966. She was a toy designer.
During the Cultural Revolution, she was sentenced to forced labor, for diary entries. Her brother was tortured, and executed. She married Wang Shijing, divorced, then Cai Zhongpai, and divorced. She was a member of the Chinese Woman's Association.

Her novel was criticized by the Chinese Youth Daily.
In 1985, she requested political asylum in Germany.
In 1993, she became a German citizen.

Works

Yi ge dongtian de tonghua, 1980; Xianggang Zhongwen Daxue Fanyi Yanjiu Zhongxin, 1987
A Chinese winter's tale: an autobiographical fragment, Chinese University of Hong Kong, 1986, 
Le nouveau conte d'hiver, Translators San Huang, Miguel Mandarès, C. Bourgois, 1982, 
Ein Wintermärchen, Michael Nerlich, Engelhardt-Ng, 1985, 
Chuntian de tonghua, 1982
Conte de printemps, Translators San Huang, Miguel Mandarès, C. Bourgois, 1984, 
Seeking, 1983

References

Sources
"Private Issues, Public Discourse: The Life and Times of Yu Luojin", Emily Honig, Pacific Affairs, Vol. 57, No. 2 (Summer, 1984), pp. 252–265

External links
http://chinaperspectives.revues.org/3032

1946 births
Writers from Beijing
Chinese expatriates in Germany
Living people